Craig G. Bartholomew (MA, Potchefstroom University, PhD, Bristol University) is the director of the Kirby Laing Centre for Public Theology. Formerly, he was senior research fellow at the University of Gloucestershire and recently the H. Evan Runner Professor of philosophy at Redeemer University College.

Biography
Craig Bartholomew studied theology at the University of South Africa and at Oxford University. He was ordained to the ministry in the Church of England in South Africa (CESA). He spent three years in the pastoral ministry before taking up a lecturing position at CESA's George Whitefield College in Cape Town, when he was involved in founding "Christian Worldview Network." CWN worked with Christian artists and published A Manifesto for Christians in the Arts.

He completed a master's degree through Potchefstroom University, and finished his doctorate on Ecclesiastes in the UK in 1997. 2004-2017 he held the H. Evan Runner Chair in Philosophy at Redeemer University College. Prior to 2004, Craig Bartholomew was a senior research fellow in the Department of Religion and Theology at the University of Gloucestershire, Cheltenham, England. In 2017 he became director of the Kirby Laing Institute for Christian Ethics.

Bartholomew was previously editor of Journal of Theological Interpretation.

Academic Societies/Activities
Old Testament Society of South Africa (OTSSA)
Tyndale Fellowship for Biblical and Theological Research, Cambridge UK.
The British Society for the Philosophy of Religion.
The Society for Old Testament Study (UK).
Society of Biblical Literature.
Member of the advisory board of Gospel and Culture, UK (concluded)
Founder of Paideia Centre for Public Theology
Member of Grove books [biblical] board, UK. (concluded).

Works
Below is a selection from his extensive published output.

Thesis

Books and chapters

 - shorter version of the edition published by Baker in 2004

 - a version of The Drama of Scripture

Chapters

Articles

 - abbreviated form of Themelios 1997 article
.

Popular Publications and Activities
Editor of Christians and the Arts in South Africa: A Manifesto. Art Care Trust, 1993. Also published as Manifesto. Christians and the Arts in South Africa In 1994, Venster op die Kunste Christelike Perspektiewe, Window on the Arts Christian Perspectives, Potchefstroom: IRS, 475–90.
An Introduction to the Relationship between Theology and Philosophy. M2M Academic Supplement 1 1993: 2–9.
Author of the Bible Helps for the 1997 English edition of the Contemporary English Version, published under the title Into the Light.
The Text and the Message, in The New Lion Handbook to the Bible (Oxford: Lion, 1999), 58–59.
 Founder and Chairperson of Christian Worldview Network, and regular contributor to The Big Picture (formerly the Many to Many).

References

External sources
Kirby Laing Institute for Christian Ethics
All of Life Redeemed
Biblical Theology Authors Page
Bible Society

1961 births
Living people
People from Pinetown
North-West University alumni
University of South Africa alumni
Alumni of the University of Oxford
Alumni of the University of Bristol
Calvinist and Reformed philosophers
South African biblical scholars
Academics of the University of Gloucestershire
Academic journal editors
Hermeneutists
Reformed Evangelical Anglican Church of South Africa clergy